The  Little League World Series was held from August 23 to August 26 in Williamsport, Pennsylvania. Morrisville Little League of Morrisville, Pennsylvania, defeated Delaware Township Little League of Delaware Township, New Jersey, in the championship game of the 9th Little League World Series.

This was the first time that the Little League World Series title was won with a walk-off home run, hit by Rich Cominski in the bottom of the 7th inning. Attendees at the final game included former General of the Army George Marshall and Governor of Pennsylvania George M. Leader.

Teams

Delaware Township was renamed Cherry Hill in November 1961

Championship bracket

Notable players
 Billy Hunter of Delaware Township went on to play in the National Football League, and later served as executive director of the National Basketball Players Association; he was inducted to the Little League Hall of Excellence in 2000.

 Dick Hart of Morrisville played in the NFL for the Philadelphia Eagles and Buffalo Bills.

References

Further reading

External links
1955 Tournament Bracket via Wayback Machine
1955 Line Scores via Wayback Machine

Little League World Series
Little League World Series
Little League World Series
August 1955 sports events in the United States
Little League World Series